Nadella or Nadellaa, originally from Nadendla, a village in Guntur district, Andhra Pradesh, India, may refer to:

People
 Nadella (surname), various people with the last name
 Nadella Purushottama Kavi (1863–1938), Indian scholar, playwright, teacher and editor

See also
 Nadela, a system of canals and rivers in northern Serbia
 Nadellaa, an inhabited islands of Gaafu Dhaalu Atoll, Maldives

Indian names